10 is a greatest hits album by American Christian rock band MercyMe. Released on April 7, 2009 in commemoration of the tenth anniversary of the band's single "I Can Only Imagine". The album contains twelve of the band's number-one singles from five studio albums (Almost There, Spoken For, Undone, Coming Up to Breathe, and All That Is Within Me) as well as a re-recording of "I Can Only Imagine" featuring the London Sessions Orchestra, in addition to two other bonus tracks. Additional content, which varies depending on the version of the album, includes music videos, featurettes, and live recordings.

10 received mostly positive reviews from music critics, and the amount of content as well as the videos included with the album received particular praise. It debuted at number 18 on the Billboard 200 and number one on the Billboard Christian Albums chart, selling 30,000 copies in its first week. Billboard ranked the album as the 13th best-selling Christian album of 2009 and the 40th best-selling Christian album of 2010 in the United States.

Background
10 was released to commemorate the tenth anniversary of MercyMe's single "I Can Only Imagine". In 1999, the band was working on an independent record, The Worship Project, and needed one more song to fill out the project. Lead singer Bart Millard wrote the song while reminiscing about his father's death. Although the band was aiming to produce a worship record of easy-to-sing songs, they included it because it was important to Millard. It was later included on the band's major-label debut, 2001's Almost There, where it became a hit on Christian radio before crossing over and becoming successful on mainstream radio in 2003. Around eight months before the release of 10, the band had been approached by their label about producing a greatest-hits record. The band was initially against the idea, and according to Millard, they felt it had always meant a band was near the end of their career. However, Millard later remembered he had written the song in 1999, and the idea shifted from a greatest-hits record to a celebration of the song's ten-year anniversary, a concept the band was more comfortable with.

Content

Music
10 includes fifteen songs: twelve of the band's number-one Christian radio singles (three each from Undone, Coming Up to Breathe, and All That Is Within Me, two from Spoken For, and one from Almost There), as well as three bonus tracks. Live versions of ten of the band's songs were also included on some versions of the album "I Can Only Imagine (Symphony Edition)" was recorded at Abbey Road Studios in London with the London Session Orchestra. "Ten Simple Rules", described as having a "Fifties twist" sound, was originally included as music video on Hoop Dogz, a children's video DVD. Lyrically, it relates the Ten Commandments. The band had begun playing it in concerts and, according to Millard, it developed a following of fans who wanted it to be put on CD. "Only Temporary", a rock song with a "distinct southern influence", was a new track, which the band had not included on any other album or project.

Videos
Physical versions of 10 were released with a 'Sight' DVD containing video content. In addition to music videos for "I Can Only Imagine", "So Long Self", "God with Us", "You Reign", and "Finally Home", it includes live videos for "Word of God Speak", "Bring the Rain", and "Hold Fast" that were recorded live throughout the band's fall 2008 tour by one camera. "Spoken For" and "Homesick" were taken from the band's 2004 live DVD MercyMe Live, while "In the Blink of an Eye" was taken from the collector's edition of their 2007 album All That Is Within Me. Two featurettes were also included: "The Making of 'I Can Only Imagine'", which had previously appeared on MercyMe Live, and "Gospel Music Channel's Faith & Fame: MercyMe", which recounts the band's career from their early years on. The iTunes version of 10 only includes the two featurettes.

Release and commercial performance
10 was released on April 7, 2009. Several different versions of the album were released. Physically, the album received a release in a two-disc collection, featuring the 'Sound' CD and 'Sight' DVD, as well as in a three-disc "Deluxe Edition" including an additional CD of 10 live songs. Digitally, 10 was released to iTunes on October 7, 2009, including the sound CD content and live recordings, as well as the two documentaries.

10 sold 30,000 copies in its first week, debuting at number 18 on the Billboard 200 and number one on the Billboard Christian Albums chart. It spent two weeks atop the Christian Albums chart and 73 weeks on the chart in total. It ranked as the 13th best-selling Christian album of 2009 in the United States and the 40th best-selling Christian album of 2010 in the United States.

Critical reception

10 received mostly positive reviews from music critics. Jared Johnson of AllMusic gave the album 4.5 out of 5 stars and noted it as an 'Album Pick', calling it "one of the best and most long-awaited greatest-hits albums in recent memory". Johnson praised the amount of content, saying "For fans, the videos alone make this worth picking up". Jenna DeWitt of The Baylor Lariat gave it an A−, praising "I Can Only Imagine (Symphony Edition)" as "awe-inspiring" as well as the DVD content, and saying "the only mistake in buying this album is if you are really tired of the extensive radio airplay that these hits have gotten". Dave Derbyshire of Cross Rhythms gave the album nine out of ten squares, calling it a "brilliant introduction" to the band. His only criticism on the album was that he considered a few of the songs as being overly sentimental. Matt Johnson of Jesus Freak Hideout gave the album three out of five stars. Johnson noted the DVD content as being "what really makes this worth your money", but was critical of the interface; he also felt the CD content, while solid, did not include enough songs and that the new recordings weren't particularly impressive. He noted the orchestra and Millard's vocals as conflicting on the re-recording of "I Can Only Imagine", but also said that it "takes the song to new heights than previously conceived". Justin Michael of Sight Magazine gave the album a positive review, calling it "A must for all MercyMe fans, for those who need a hooky melody with a message and for people who love getting a free DVD with their albums!"; he also praised the one-camera tour videos, but noted "Ten Simple Rules" is "not their brightest musical moment".

Track listing

Personnel
Credits from the album liner notes

MercyMe
 Jim Bryson – keys
 Nathan Cochran – bass guitar
 Barry Graul – guitar
 Bart Millard – lead vocals
 Mike Scheuchzer – guitar
 Robby Shaffer – drums

Technical and design
 Tony Baker – photography
 Brown Bannister – producer, engineering, digital editing
 Kristin Barlowe – photography
 Steve Bishir – recording, mixing, tracking
 Bob Clearmountain – mixing
 Jeremy Cowart – photography
 Richard Dodd – mastering
 Kent Hooper – keyboard programming, digital editing
 Ted Jensen – mastering
 Pete Kipley – producer
 Shatrine Krake – design and layout
 Stephen Marcussen – mastering
 Carl Marsh – string arrangements, conductor
 Blair Masters – keyboard programming
 Rob Mathes – string arrangements
 MercyMe – producer
 Simon Rhodes – recording (strings)
 Shawn Sanders – photography
 Salvo – mixing
 F. Reid Shippen – mixing
 Derek West – mastering
 Rob Wexler – recording
 Billy Whittinington – digital editing
 Dave Younkman – recording

Additional performers
 The London Sessions Orchestra – strings
 Todd Snider – harmonica

Video content
 Steve Bussel – editing
 Joel Cameron – mixing
 Chris Grainger – recording
 Tameron Hedge – producer
 Kyle Lollis – editing, producer
 Russ Long – recording
 Mark McCallie – director
 MercyMe – producer
 Dan O'Connell – DVD authoring, editing
 Dustin Reynolds – audio recording
 Mike Scheuchzer – audio recording
 Scott Simmons – editing
 Ryan Slaughter – video recording, editing
 Dennis Stams – editing
 Aaron Swihart – recording, mixing
 Eric Walsh – director, editing
 Todd White – editing, producing

Charts

References

MercyMe compilation albums
2009 greatest hits albums
INO Records compilation albums
Columbia Records compilation albums